Cheryl Forchuk is a professor of mental health and ageing at the Lawson Health Research Institute, Canada.

Early life
Forchuk studied Psychology and Nursing at the University of Windsor from 1972-1976. In 1980, she received a master's degree in nursing from
the University of Toronto. In 1992, she received a Ph.D. degree in nursing from Wayne State University, USA.

Career
Forchuk joined University of Western Ontario, London Health Sciences Center, as a nurse specialist/nurse scientist and associate professor in 1994. In 2009, she became an assistant director at Lawson Health Research Institute and Associate Director Nursing Research at Western University. Currently, she is distinguished university professor at the Faculty of Health Sciences at University of Western Ontario. and the Beryl and Richard Ivey Research Chair in Aging, Mental Health, Rehabilitation and Recovery.

Awards
Forchuk was elected fellow of the Canadian Academy of Health Sciences in 2015. She was awarded the Order of Ontario in 2017 for her contributions to addressing issues on mental health, poverty and homelessness. In 2020, she received the Hellmuth Prize.

References

Living people
21st-century Canadian women scientists
Canadian nurses
Canadian women nurses
Academics in Ontario
University of Windsor alumni
University of Toronto alumni
Wayne State University alumni
Academic staff of the University of Western Ontario
Fellows of the Canadian Academy of Health Sciences
Members of the Order of Ontario
Year of birth missing (living people)
Canadian psychologists